Plumen is a designer low energy lighting company based in London, UK. The Plumen 001, their debut product, is a designer low energy compact fluorescent light. The design of the Plumen 001 lightbulb is result of collaboration between the Hulger team and designer Samuel Wilkinson. A prototype of the Plumen 001 has been added to MOMA permanent design collection, and has won Brit Insurance Design Awards 2011.

The Plumen 001 bulb launched in September 2010 and was joined by the Plumen 002 that was launched on Kickstarter in January 2014. Plumen also produces accessories and shades to be used with their light bulb designs, establishing Plumen as an efficient designer lighting brand that sells in over 75 countries worldwide.

Plumen's designs and IP was sold to Creative Cables SRl in 2022 who have now taken over the brand and products and continue to sell and develop Plumen products worldwide.

Product Range
The Plumen 001 is a compact fluorescent light which uses 11 Watt to emit up to 680 Lumen with colour temperature 2700k (warm white light).

The Plumen 002 is an LED lamp which uses 4 Watt to emit up to 245 Lumen with colour temperature 2200k (very warm white light). 

The Plumen 003  is an LED lamp which uses 6.5 watts. to emit up to 250 Lumen with colour temperature 2400k (very warm white light). The bulb was designed in collaboration between Hulger, British industrial designer Claire Norcross and French jewellery designer Marie-Laure Giroux

In 2016 Plumen also launched a lower cost range of designer filament LED bulbs under the brand WattNott 

The 001 and 002 lamp designs are protected by US patent D665,930 S and US patent US D738,545 S respectively.

Awards and collections
 Museum of Modern Art (MoMA) Permanent design collection
 Cooper-Hewitt, National Design Museum Permanent design collection
 Victoria and Albert Museum Permanent collection
 MoMA Design and The Elastic Mind exhibition 2008
 The Art Institute of Chicago
 Helsinki Design Museum
 Brit Insurance Design Awards Design of the Year Winner 2011
 D&AD Black Pencil 2011
 Homes & Gardens 'Eco Product of the Year' 2011
 Smarta Award 'Innovation' 2011
 GQ Best Stuff of The Year 2011
 Elle Deco Best Sustainable Design Award 2014 (Plumen 002)
 GQ Best Stuff of The Year 2014 - Plumen 002 (China edition)

References

External links
Official Website
Outdoor Lighting Product
Brit Insurance Award 2011
MOMA Permanent Collection Page
Coverage - Fast Company (magazine)

Lighting
British design